The 32X is an add-on for the Sega Genesis video game console. Codenamed "Project Mars", the 32X was designed to expand the power of the Genesis and serve as a holdover until the release of the Sega Saturn.  Independent of the Genesis, the 32X used its own ROM cartridges and had its own library of games.  A total of 40 titles were produced worldwide, including six that required both the 32X and Sega CD add-ons, and ten that were released only in North America.

Unveiled at June 1994's Consumer Electronics Show, Sega presented the 32X as the "poor man's entry into 'next generation' games." The product was originally conceived as an entirely new console by Sega of Japan and positioned as an inexpensive alternative for gamers into the 32-bit era, but at the suggestion of Sega of America research and development head Joe Miller, the console was converted into an add-on to the existing Genesis and made more powerful, with two 32-bit central processing unit chips and a 3D graphics processor.  Despite these changes, the console failed to attract either developers or consumers as the Sega Saturn had already been announced for release the next year. In part because of this, and also to rush the 32X to market before the holiday season in 1994, the 32X suffered from a poor library of titles, including Genesis ports with improvements to the number of colors that appeared on screen.  Originally released at US$159, Sega dropped the price to $99 in only a few months and ultimately cleared the remaining inventory at $19.95. 800,000 units were sold worldwide.

The following list contains all of the games released for the 32X, as well as the games that required both the 32X and the CD.  Among the titles for the 32X were ports of arcade games Space Harrier and Star Wars Arcade, a sidescroller with a hummingbird as a main character in Kolibri, a 32X-exclusive game in the Sonic the Hedgehog series in Knuckles' Chaotix, and a version of Doom that was noted for its movement and game length issues when compared to other versions of the game.  In a retrospective review of the console, Star Wars Arcade was considered the best game for the 32X by IGN for its co-operative play, soundtrack, and faithful reproduction of the experiences of Star Wars.

Games

Cancelled games

See also

List of Sega Genesis games
List of Sega CD games
List of cancelled games for Sega consoles
Lists of video games

References

 
Sega 32X
32X